Fejeran is a surname. Notable people with the surname include:

 Melissa Fejeran (born 1976), weightlifter from Guam
 Pete Fejeran (born 1971), weightlifter from Guam